UFC 234: Adesanya vs. Silva was a mixed martial arts event produced by the Ultimate Fighting Championship that was held on February 10, 2019 at Rod Laver Arena in Melbourne, Victoria, Australia.

Background 
A UFC Middleweight Championship bout between current champion Robert Whittaker (also The Ultimate Fighter: The Smashes welterweight winner) and The Ultimate Fighter: Team Jones vs. Team Sonnen middleweight winner Kelvin Gastelum was expected to headline the event. However, Whittaker pulled out of the event a few hours prior due to a hernia and a twisted and collapsed bowel that forced him to undergo emergency surgery later that day. As a result of the last-minute change, the three-round co-main event between Israel Adesanya and former champion Anderson Silva was bumped up to the main event spot.

Ryan Spann was expected to face Jimmy Crute at the event. However, on January 25, it was reported that Spann was forced to pull out due to a hand injury and was replaced by Sam Alvey.

Alex Gorgees was expected to face Jalin Turner at the event. However, it was reported that, on January 27, Gorgees was pulled from the card for an undisclosed reason and he was replaced by Callan Potter.

Results

Bonus awards
The following fighters were awarded $50,000 bonuses:
Fight of the Night: Israel Adesanya vs. Anderson Silva
Performance of the Night: Montana De La Rosa and Devonte Smith

See also 

 List of UFC events
 2019 in UFC
 List of current UFC fighters

References 

Ultimate Fighting Championship events
2019 in Australian sport
2019 in mixed martial arts
Mixed martial arts in Australia
Sports competitions in Melbourne
February 2019 sports events in Australia